Menora is a suburb of Perth, Western Australia. Its local government area is the City of Stirling.

In 1954, with the establishment of official suburban boundaries, the new offshoot from Mount Lawley was named Menora in honour of an old theatre of that name which was located within its borders. Further support for the name was provided by the local Jewish community for whom the Menorah holds special significance. From an aerial point of view, a section of the roads are shaped like the Menorah.

Menora is home to a large Jewish community (8.1%), the heart of which is the Perth Hebrew Congregation. It is close to the Carmel Jewish School and other Kosher facilities like the Kosher Food Centre in Menora and the Kosher Besh Fresh cafe.

The median weekly family income from the 2016 census data in Menora (State Suburbs) was $2,493 (as compared with $1,910 for the whole of Western Australia and $1,734 for the whole of Australia). Of occupied private dwellings in Menora, 38.9% were owned outright, 23.2% were owned with a mortgage and 14.9% were rented. Of all households, 60.8% were family households, 37.5% were single person households and 1.7% were group households.

This is likely attributable to a high concentration of retirement villages in the district.

References

Jews and Judaism in Western Australia
Suburbs of Perth, Western Australia
Suburbs in the City of Stirling